The following is a list of Christian hardcore bands, organized alphabetically.

Christian hardcore is a subgenre of hardcore punk primarily distinguished by its lyrical focus on Christian themes and values, although former Burden of a Day guitarist Bryan Honhart has suggested that the genre also possesses sonic distinctions. Bands such as The Crucified, Focused, Focal Point, Zao and No Innocent Victim are considered progenitors of the movement. In recent years, Demon Hunter and The Chariot  have gained considerable popularity among fans of the genre, while metalcore bands such as Underoath, As I Lay Dying, and Norma Jean have served as mainstream representatives of the genre.

This list consists of Christian bands that play hardcore punk or any hardcore punk subgenres.

List

0–9

 38th Parallel
 3rd Root
 '68
 7 Angels 7 Plagues

A

 Ace Augustine
 Advent
 Akissforjersey
 Alove for Enemies
 Altars
 Ambassadors of Shalom
 Anberlin
 And Then There Were None (early)
 Ark of the Covenant
 Artifex Pereo 
As Cities Burn
 As Hell Retreats
 As They Sleep
 The Ascendicate
 At the Throne of Judgment
 Attalus
 August Burns Red

B

 Beartooth
 Becoming the Archetype
 Becoming Saints
 Before Their Eyes
 Behold the Kingdom
 Being as an Ocean
 Beloved
 Benea Reach
 Besieged
 The Blamed
 Blenderhead
 Blessed by a Broken Heart
 Blindside
 Bloodline Severed
 Bloodlined Calligraphy
 Bloodshed
 The Blue Letter
 Born Blind
 Brandtson
 A Bullet for Pretty Boy
 Burden of a Day
 Burn It Down

C

 Call to Preserve
 Callisto
 The Chariot
 Chasing Victory
 Christ's Sake
 The Classic Crime
 Clear Convictions
 Close Your Eyes
 The Color Morale
 Colossus
 Comrades
 Confide
 Conveyer
 Convictions
 Corpus Christi
 Crashdog
 Creations
 Cries Hannah
 The Crimson Armada
 The Crucified
 Cry of the Afflicted

D

 Darkness Divided
 Day of Vengeance
 Dead Poetic
 Dear Ephesus
 Debtor
 Demise of Eros
 Demon Hunter
 Dependency
 Destroy the Runner
 The Devil Wears Prada
 Disciple (early)
 Divide the Sea
 Dizmas (early)
 Dogwood
 Doomsday Hymn
 Dynasty

E

 Earth Groans
 East West
 Edison Glass
 Embodiment 12:14
 Embodyment
 Emery
 Enlow
 Eso-Charis
 Everdown
 Every Day Life
 Every Knee Shall Bow
 Everything in Slow Motion
 Extol

F

Falling Cycle
Fallstar
 Family Force 5
 The Famine
 Far-Less
 Fasedown
 Few Left Standing
Fight the Fury
 Figure Four
 Final Surrender
 Fireflight (early)
 Fit for a King
 Flee the Seen
 Flyleaf
 Focal Point (band)
 Focused
 For All Eternity
For the Fallen Dreams
 For Today
Foreknown
 Forever Changed
 ForeverAtLast
 Forevermore
 Forfeit Thee Untrue
 Further Seems Forever

G

The Gentleman Homicide
Gideon
Glass Casket
 The Great Commission
 Gwen Stacy

H

Hands
 The Handshake Murders
 Haste the Day
 He Is Legend
 Headnoise
 Hearts Like Lions
 Here I Come Falling
 A Hill to Die Upon (early)
 The Hoax
 Hope For The Dying
 Hopesfall
 Hotel Books
 Hundredth

I

 I Am Alpha and Omega
 I Am Empire
 I Am Terrified
 I, the Breather
 Impending Doom
 In the Midst of Lions
 Inhale Exhale
 Inked In Blood
 Ironwill
Islander
Ivoryline

J

 Jamie's Elsewhere
 Jawbone
 Jesus Wept
 Judgement X Day
 The Juliana Theory
 Justifide

K

 Kids in the Way
 Kingston Falls

L

 Lament
 Leaders
 Left Out
Letter to the Exiles
 Life in Your Way
 Living Sacrifice
 Lucerin Blue
 Lust Control
 Luti-Kriss

M

 Manafest
 Maranatha
 Maylene and the Sons of Disaster
 Means
 Memphis May Fire
 Metanoia
 Mindrage
 Misery Chastain
 Mortal Treason
 Mortification
 My Heart to Fear
 MyChildren MyBride

N

 Nailed Promise
 New Waters
 Ninety Pound Wuss
 No Innocent Victim
 Nobody Special
 Nodes of Ranvier
 Norma Jean
 Nothing Til Blood

O

 Officer Negative
 Oh, Sleeper
 The Old-Timers
 Once Nothing
 One Bad Pig
The Ongoing Concept
 Onward to Olympas
 The Out Circuit
 Overcome
 The Overseer

P

 P.O.D.
 A Past Unknown
 Phinehas
 Pillar (early)
 Platoon 1107
 A Plea for Purging
 Point of Recognition
 Poured Out
 Project 86

R

R.A.I.D.
Raid
 Rapture
 The Red Baron
 The Red Jumpsuit Apparatus
 Remembrance
 Remove the Veil
 Rival Choir
 Rod Laver

S

 Saints Never Surrender
 Saving Grace
 Scarlet
 Scaterd Few
 See the Rise
 Seemless
 Selfmindead
 Sent by Ravens
 Serianna
 Seventh Star
 Sever Your Ties
 Showbread
 The Showdown
 Silent Planet
 Sinai Beach
 Since Remembered
 Six Feet Deep
 Sleeping by the Riverside
 Sleeping Giant
 Society's Finest
 Solus Deus
 Sovereign Strength
Spirit and the Bride
Spitfire
 Spoken
 Stand Your Ground
 Staple
 Stars Are Falling
 Stavesacre
 Still Breathing
 Still Remains
 Strengthen What Remains
 Stretch Arm Strong
 Strongarm
 Symphony in Peril

T

 Take It Back!
Tantrum of the Muse
 Ten 33
 Terminal
 Texas in July
 These Hearts
 Thin Ice
 This Beautiful Republic
 This Is Hell
 This or the Apocalypse
Those Who Fear
 Thousand Foot Krutch
 A Thousand Times Repent
 Thrice
 Through Solace
 Times of Grace
 To Speak of Wolves
 Training for Utopia
 Trenches
 Twelve Gauge Valentine

U

 Unashamed
 Undercover
 Underoath
 UnTeachers

V

 Venia
 Vomitorial Corpulence

W

 War of Ages
 Warlord
 We Came as Romans
 We the Gathered
 The Wedding
 What We Do in Secret
 With Blood Comes Cleansing
 With Increase
 Wolves at the Gate
Wovenwar
Wrench in the Works

X

 xDEATHSTARx
 xDISCIPLEx A.D.
 xLooking Forwardx
 XXI

Y

 Your Chance to Die
 Your Memorial
 Yours for Mine

Z
 Zao

See also 
 Christian hardcore
 Christian punk
 List of Christian punk bands
 List of hardcore punk bands
 List of Christian metal artists

Notes

References

Bibliography

Hardcore
Lists of hardcore punk bands
Christian hardcore musical groups